Sunnyside is a historic plantation house located at Clarksville, Mecklenburg County, Virginia. The house was built in three sections: a one-room, two-story, three-bay frame dwelling with a side passage, built in 1833; a two-story, three bay I-house, begun in 1836 in front of the first dwelling and connected to it by a one-story hyphen; and a two-story, one room, one-bay addition built in 1837.  Also on the property are the contributing late-19th century kitchen, an early-to-mid-19th century servant's quarter, an early-to-mid-19th century smokehouse, a mid-19th century shed, an early-20th century chicken house, the site of a 19th-century ice pit, a 19th and early 20th century tenant house / tobacco processing barn, three late 19th or early-20th century log tobacco barns, a 19th-century log tenant house, and the Carrington / Johnson family cemetery.

It was listed on the National Register of Historic Places in 1996.

References

Plantation houses in Virginia
Houses on the National Register of Historic Places in Virginia
Houses completed in 1837
Houses in Mecklenburg County, Virginia
National Register of Historic Places in Mecklenburg County, Virginia